Hatch End is a railway station in the London Borough of Harrow, in north London, and in Travelcard Zone 6. London Underground's Bakerloo line trains served the station from 16 April 1917 until 24 September 1982. London Overground services on the Watford DC Line from London Euston currently serve this station.

History
It was renamed Pinner and Hatch End on 1 January 1897. The present station was built in 1911 to a design by architect Gerald Horsley, son of the painter John Calcott Horsley. The station was again renamed Hatch End (for Pinner) on 1 February 1920, and finally Hatch End on 11 June 1956. Bakerloo line services were withdrawn on 24 September 1982.

It has two platforms. The northbound (down) platform is on the side of the ticket office and cafe. The southbound (up) platform is reached via a footbridge. This platform was originally an island platform with the other face on the adjacent down fast main line. There was another island platform serving the up fast and down semi-fast lines and a further platform for the up semi-fasts. These other platforms were closed in 1963. A general rebuilding of the access to the two remaining platforms in use was built in the 1980s and a fence built along to shield waiting passengers from the fast trains. Ticket barriers were installed in early 2010.

Services

Hatch End station is on the West Coast Main Line but served only by 'all stations' trains on the Watford DC Line, with four trains per hour operated by London Overground to London Euston (southbound) and Watford Junction (northbound). This is the standard service, seven days a week. The typical journey time to Euston is 38 minutes and to Watford Junction 11 minutes.

Connections are available at Harrow & Wealdstone for a West Midlands Trains (London Northwestern Railway) fast service to London Euston or the Southern service to East Croydon, or the Bakerloo line calling at all stations to Elephant & Castle. Figures show that many change at Harrow & Wealdstone for the Southern train to alight at West Brompton or Kensington Olympia for the District line for central London. Also, those who have changed onto the Southern Train have the option for other Southern services and South Western Railway at Clapham Junction.

The station was previously served by the Bakerloo line of the London Underground.

In 2007, the station added to its facilities a cafe selling various beverages, snacks and newspapers; this on the northbound platform. The ticket office has improved opening hours and is more or less open when every train comes through. If not, there are several customer service assistants around if need be. There are also two ticket machines in the foyer where one can buy any national rail tickets, as well as travel cards, and oyster tickets. Under the new management of London Overground there has been significant improvement such as new signs, more CCTV and electronic departure boards in the foyer, both platforms and the southbound shelter.

In early 2010, Hatch End Station has had ticket barriers installed, in common with many other London Overground Stations. There are two barriers, and another barrier for luggage and wheelchair users. There are still two ticket machines, and the ticket office which is now open much more regularly.

Architectural critic and Poet Laureate Sir John Betjeman was an admirer of Hatch End railway station and described it as "half-way between a bank and a medium-sized country house" – Metroland.

Connections
London Buses routes H12 & H14 serve the station.

References

External links

Railway stations in the London Borough of Harrow
DfT Category E stations
Former London and North Western Railway stations
Railway stations in Great Britain opened in 1844
Railway stations served by London Overground
Proposed London Underground stations
Grade II listed buildings in the London Borough of Harrow
Grade II listed railway stations